Thomas Gibb Ritchie (born 2 January 1952) is a Scottish former footballer who made over 440 appearances in the Football League scoring 110 league goals playing as a striker, most notably for Bristol City.

Career

Born in Edinburgh, Tom Ritchie played locally for Bridgend Thistle in Scotland. Bristol City manager Alan Dicks signed Ritchie in July 1969. Ritchie established himself in the Bristol City attack, playing a key role in the club's rise to the First Division by 1976. He stayed with Bristol City until January 1981 when, following City's relegation, he transferred to Sunderland for £180,000. Then followed a loan spell at Carlisle United. Ritchie returned to Bristol City when manager Terry Cooper signed him on a free transfer in June 1982 following the club's relegation to the Fourth Division. Ritchie would become one of the few players to play for Bristol City in all four divisions along with Chris Garland. Ritchie left Bristol City for the second time in December 1984 when signed by former colleague Gerry Gow for Yeovil Town in the Southern League.

References

External links
 

Scottish footballers
Bristol City F.C. players
Sunderland A.F.C. players
Carlisle United F.C. players
Yeovil Town F.C. players
1952 births
Living people
English Football League players
Southern Football League players
Association football forwards